Shibonta is a settlement in the Java district of South Ossetia.

See also
 Dzau district

References 

Populated places in Dzau District